Éder Nicolás Borelli Cap (born 25 November 1990) is a Mexican professional footballer who plays as a left-back for USL Championship club El Paso Locomotive.

Club career
Despite living many years in Argentina, he wanted to play in Mexico and it came true when he was signed by Liga MX club Querétaro.

After spending several seasons with Juárez, Borelli moved across the border to join USL Championship club El Paso Locomotive FC.

Honours
Tigres UANL
Mexican Primera División: Apertura 2011

References

Personal life
Borelli's father, Jorge, is an Argentine former footballer who played for Tigres UNAL when he has born. Borelli is also of Italian descent.

External links 
 
 
 
 
 

1990 births
Living people
Footballers from Nuevo León
Sportspeople from Monterrey
Mexican people of Argentine descent
Sportspeople of Argentine descent
Association football defenders
Nueva Chicago footballers
Querétaro F.C. footballers
Tigres UANL footballers
Correcaminos UAT footballers
FC Juárez footballers
El Paso Locomotive FC players
Liga MX players
Mexican expatriate footballers
Mexican expatriate sportspeople in Argentina
Mexican expatriate sportspeople in the United States
Expatriate footballers in Argentina
Expatriate soccer players in the United States
Mexican people of Italian descent
USL Championship players
Mexican footballers